Ensign Worth Bagley (April 6, 1874 – May 11, 1898) was a United States Navy officer during the Spanish–American War, distinguished as the only U.S. naval officer killed in action during that war.

Biography

Born in Raleigh, North Carolina, a son of William Henry Bagley, he graduated from the United States Naval Academy in 1895. In November he was appointed inspector of the new torpedo-boat,  and when she went into commission on December 28, he was assigned as her executive officer under Lieutenant John Baptiste Bernadou.

In April 1898, the Winslow was with the fleet, mobilized for operations in Cuban waters. She was fired upon by the Spanish gunboat Antonio López, and immediately there was a general engagement. The Winslow was soon disabled, and was with difficulty hauled out of range of the Spanish guns by Hudson. Just as the engagement ended, Ensign Bagley and four sailors were killed by a shell.

Namesakes
The fourth, honors both Worth Bagley and his brother, Admiral David W. Bagley.

References
 history.navy.mil: USS Bagley

Attribution
From the 1901 Encyclopaedia of United States History

External links

1874 births
1898 deaths
American military personnel of the Spanish–American War
Worth
United States Navy officers
American military personnel killed in the Spanish–American War
United States Naval Academy alumni